Frederick Elijah Wadsworth (March 7, 1786 in Litchfield, Connecticut – February 3, 1869 in Edinburg, Ohio) was an Ohio militia officer, businessman, banker, and politician.

Family

Frederick was born in 1786 at the family home in Litchfield, Connecticut. He was the son of Major General Elijah Wadsworth and his wife Rhoda Hopkins. Frederick was a member of the prominent Wadsworth family of Connecticut. He is a descendant of William Wadsworth, one of the Founders of Hartford, Connecticut. He moved to Ohio, at 13, with his family in 1799. In October 1802 he moved to the new family home in Canfield, Ohio where he grew to adulthood. Frederick married Statira Smith of New York and had eight children. Frederick Wadsworth's House, built 1824, located in Edinburg, Ohio is on the National Register of Historic Places (May 29, 1975 #75001520).

War of 1812

On 26 May 1812 Lieutenant Frederick Wadsworth was appointed, by his father, as the Regimental Clerk for the 2nd Regiment, 4th Brigade, 4th Division of the Ohio State Militia under Colonel John Wilson Campbell.

Business and politics
Frederick was a proprietor and partner of Stoddard & Wadsworth Co. a wool carding works in 1825. Later that year he was elected Secretary of the Portage County Agricultural Society on 9 May 1825.

Frederick was an appointed representative of Portage County during the Canal Commission on 10 March 1826 that worked for the creation of the Portage Canal. Frederick was at the Anti-Masonic Party Convention in Philadelphia, Pennsylvania on September 11, 1830. He was also elected Sheriff of Portage County, Ohio in 1834.

He formed a partnership with several investors, including Simon Perkins and Eleazer Sackett, which led to the creation of the Portage Canal & Manufacturing Co. on February 27, 1837. Frederick was also one of 5 co-owners of the Etna Iron Company on March 29, 1837. That same year Frederick was appointed a Director of the Bank of Cleveland. Later, in 1846, he was the President of the Portage County Mutual Fire Insurance Company.

Frederick Wadsworth was elected Mayor of Akron, Ohio in 1852-1853.

References

"Early History of Cleveland Ohio..." by Col. Charles Whittlesey, Cleveland, 1832 (PDF avail.)
"History of Portage County, Ohio: Containing a history of the County..." Warner, beers and Co., Chicago, 1885
"Cases of the Supreme Court of Ohio 1833-1834" by Charles Hammond, Esq., Cincinnati, 1872
"Acts of the State of Ohio", By the Ohio General Assembly, Columbus 1837

External links
http://www.raremaps.com/gallery/archivedetail/18138/Map_of_The_Town_of_North_Akron_Portage_County_and_Township_Ohio_June/Ashland.html
http://politicalgraveyard.com/bio/wadhams-waggy.html

1786 births
1869 deaths
Mayors of Akron, Ohio
Businesspeople from Ohio
American militiamen in the War of 1812
Anti-Masonic Party politicians from Ohio
Wadsworth family
Politicians from Litchfield, Connecticut
People from Canfield, Ohio
19th-century American businesspeople